Titoo MBA  is a Punjabi Hindi film directed by Amit Vats and produced by Rajan Batra and Mayank Patel in association with Beatrix Entertainment.  The film stars Nishant Dahiya and Pragya Jaiswal in principal roles. The film was released on 21 November 2014.

Synopsis
Titoo (Takhat Singh Gill) is an average Chandigarh boy with big dreams of becoming a businessman. But as usual, destiny plays spoilsport and nothing works out for Titoo. Added to that his heavy debts force him to take up a completely weird and unexpected career. In the midst of this financial mess, Titoo is married off to Gulshan Kaur Grover from Jalandhar following an elaborate arranged marriage. He leads a double life for a while and tries his best to hide his embarrassing secret from his newlywed wife. But as fate would have it, she finds out all about Titoo's alternate career and the poor fellow's life flips upside down once again.

Cast
 Nishant Dahiya as Titoo
 Pragya Jaiswal as Gulshan
 Amit Mehra as Honey singh
 Abhishek Kumar
Satwant Kaur
 Pooja Balutia
 Nandini Singh
 Kishore Sharma as old man on house roof 
 Anchal Singh
Karan Sandhawalia

Soundtrack
The soundtrack was composed by Arjuna Harjai except for "Saiyaan Bedardi", which was composed by Leonard Victor. The first single, titled "O Soniye", sung by Arijit Singh and Vibha Saraf released on 13 October 2014. The lyrics were penned by Surabhi Dashputra.
 The second single titled "Plan Bana Le", sung by Aishwarya Nigam and Surabhi Dashputra released on 30 October 2014. Lyrics for the song were penned by Kumaar. The third single titled "Kya Hua" sung by Arijit Singh was released on 5 November 2014. Full album was released on 11 November 2014.

References

External links
 
 

2014 films
2010s Hindi-language films
Films set in Punjab, India
Indian comedy films
2014 comedy films
Hindi-language comedy films
Films scored by Arjuna Harjai